Donald Watt may refer to:

Academics
 D. E. R. Watt (1926–2004), Scottish historian, professor of Medieval History at St Andrews University
 Donald Cameron Watt (1928–2014), professor at London School of Economics, winner of the Wolfson History Prize

Others
 Don Watt (designer) (1936–2009), Canadian designer
 Donald Watt (sportsman) (1920–2007), Australian all-round sportsman
 Donald J. Watt (1918–2000), Australian author of a fictitious Holocaust memoir
 Don Watt (footballer) (born 1953), Scottish footballer

See also
Donald Watts (born 1951), American former basketball player